John Carl Malone (born March 7, 1941) is an American billionaire businessman, landowner, and philanthropist. He was chief executive officer (CEO) of Tele-Communications Inc. (TCI), a cable and media giant, for twenty-four years from 1973 to 1996. Malone is now chairman and largest voting shareholder of Liberty Media, Liberty Global, and Qurate Retail Group (formerly known as Liberty Interactive), and also owns 7% of Lionsgate and Starz Inc. He was interim CEO of Liberty Media, until succeeded by former Microsoft and Oracle CFO Greg Maffei. By most estimates, Malone is the largest private landowner in the United States, possessing upwards of 2.2 million acres (3,437 square miles), more than twice the size of Rhode Island.

Early life and education
John C. Malone was born on March 7, 1941, in Milford, Connecticut. His father was Daniel L. Malone, an engineer. Malone is of Irish heritage, his family originating in County Cork. Malone is a Catholic.

In 1959, Malone graduated from Hopkins School in New Haven, Connecticut. In 1963, he graduated from Yale University with a bachelor's degree in electrical engineering and economics, where he was a Phi Beta Kappa and National Merit scholar. In 1964, Malone graduated from Johns Hopkins University with a master's degree in industrial management. He received a master's in electrical engineering at an NYU program at Bell Labs in 1965 before receiving his PhD in operations research at Johns Hopkins in 1967.

Business career
In 1963, Malone began his business career at Bell Telephone Laboratories of AT&T, working in economic planning and research and development. In 1968, he joined McKinsey & Company, and in 1970, became group vice president at General Instrument Corporation (GI). He was later president of Jerrold Electronics, a GI subsidiary. For twenty-four years, from 1973 to 1996, Malone served as president and CEO of Tele-Communications Inc. (TCI).

Malone is on the boards of directors for Bank of New York Mellon, Expedia.com, Charter Communications, Warner Bros. Discovery, and Lions Gate Entertainment Corp. Malone is chairman emeritus of Cable Television Laboratories, Inc. and chairman of Liberty Global, Inc., and formerly the DirecTV Group. His rise to chairman at Liberty Global was contentious at times.

In 2005, Malone held 32 percent of the shares in the media company News Corporation, and although only about half were voting shares, Rupert Murdoch reportedly had concerns that he might lose control of his company to Malone, and tried to oust him from the firm with a "poison pill" strategy. He was director of the National Cable & Telecommunications Association (NCTA) from 1974 to 1977, and again from 1980 to 1993. During the 1977–1978 term, Malone was the NCTA's treasurer.

In 1992, Malone coined the term 500-channel universe to describe a future media environment where a vast number of TV channels would be available, by eliminating the need for broadcast radio channels as a scarce resource.

In business dealings Malone has been dubbed "Darth Vader", a nickname allegedly given to him by Al Gore when Malone was the head of TCI. 

In 1994, Wired portrayed Malone on their cover as "Mad Max" from The Road Warrior (also known as Mad Max 2), with an interview describing his battles with the FCC. He is also known as the "Cable Cowboy".

Bloomberg estimated him to be worth over US$9 billion in May 2021.

Land ownership
Malone owns Silver Spur Ranches, a ranching and beef company which includes the Silver Spur Ranch in Encampment, Wyoming, Bell Ranch and the TO Ranch in New Mexico, Bridlewood Farm, a thoroughbred breeding, training and racing operation in Ocala, Florida; as well as ranches in Walden, Colorado, and Kiowa, Colorado. , he surpassed Ted Turner as the largest individual private landowner in the US, owning  of land, much of which is in Maine, Colorado, New Mexico, and Wyoming. His international real estate holdings include Humewood Castle and Castlemartin House and Estate, both in Ireland.

Philanthropy
In 2000, Malone gave $24 million to the Yale School of Engineering & Applied Science in New Haven for the construction of Yale's Daniel L. Malone Engineering Center, named in honor of his father.

In 2011, Malone gave the Johns Hopkins Whiting School of Engineering in Baltimore its largest gift ever of $30 million for a new building on Homewood Campus. The building will be named Malone Hall.

In the same year, he gave the Yale School of Engineering & Applied Science's largest gift ever of $50 million.

Malone has also given $60 million to Hopkins School in New Haven to fund the construction of two new buildings, Malone Science Center, named for his father, as well as Heath Commons, named after his favorite Hopkins teacher.

In 2014, Malone and his wife donated $42.5 million to Colorado State University to help create their Institute for Biologic Translational Therapies, which aims to develop stem cell and other treatments for animals and people. Of the donation, $32.5 million will pay for half the construction costs and $10 million will go to operational expenses.

In 2021, the Malones donated $25 million to Maine Medical Center in Portland, Maine, for the hospital’s $534 million capital improvement project. Maine Medical Center will name a new tower for cardiac and vascular services the Malone Family Tower; Leslie Malone recently received cardiac care at the hospital.

Malone Scholars Program
In 1997, he established the Malone Family Foundation, which operates the Malone Scholars Program that provides scholarship endowments to select private schools throughout the United States.

Personal life
Malone is married to Leslie, they have two children and live in Elizabeth, Colorado. His wife is active in dressage and horse breeding and she founded Harmony Sporthorses in Kiowa, Colorado.

In 2008, their son Evan D. Malone joined the board of Liberty Media.

Malone reportedly shuns the limelight and glamorous lifestyle, taking his family vacations alongside long time friend Gary Biskup in a recreational vehicle. His native Colorado named Malone a "Citizen of the West" in 2016.

Malone's political beliefs have been described as libertarian. He is on the board of directors for the Cato Institute. He donated US$250,000 to Donald Trump's inauguration in 2017, with colleague Greg Maffei, Liberty Media and Liberty Interactive each donating an extra US$250,000. Though in 2019 during an interview with CNBC Malone stated "Look, I think a lot of things Trump has tried to do—identifying problems and trying to solve them—has been great…. I just don’t think he’s the right guy to do it. Half the people that he’s hired and thrown under the bus are now trying to kill him. I mean, what kind of thing is that?" He expressed support for Michael Bloomberg in the 2020 United States presidential election.

References

Further reading

External links
 

1941 births
American billionaires
American chief executives
American landowners
American philanthropists
AT&T people
Businesspeople from Colorado
Businesspeople from Connecticut
American chairpersons of corporations
American people of Irish descent
American cable television company founders
Hopkins School alumni
Johns Hopkins University alumni
Liberty Media people
Living people
McKinsey & Company people
People from Parker, Colorado
People from Milford, Connecticut
Yale School of Engineering & Applied Science alumni
Polytechnic Institute of New York University alumni
American libertarians